Aegiphila monstrosa is a species of flowering plant in the family Lamiaceae. It is found in Belize, Guatemala, Honduras, and Mexico. It is threatened by loss of habitat to agriculture.

References

monstrosa
Vulnerable plants
Taxonomy articles created by Polbot